Rene George Lachemann (born May 4, 1945) is a retired American professional baseball coach, catcher and manager. He spent 33 years in Major League Baseball, including service as the manager of the Seattle Mariners (1981–83), Milwaukee Brewers (1984), and expansion Florida Marlins (1993–96).

Early connections with LaRussa, Duncan
Born in Los Angeles and the son of a hotel chef, he is the youngest of three brothers to enjoy long careers in professional baseball: Marcel Lachemann is a member of the Los Angeles Angels' front office and a former pitcher, coach and manager in the Major Leagues, and Bill is a longtime manager and instructor in the Angels' farm system. Rene served as a batboy for the Los Angeles Dodgers from 1959 to 1962, graduated from Dorsey High School, and attended the University of Southern California. He signed a bonus contract with the Kansas City Athletics in 1964, where he joined other young players such as Tony La Russa and Dave Duncan, with whom he would have a lasting professional association.

He played briefly—in 26 total games—for the A's in 1966 and 1968, but spent the rest of his playing career in minor league baseball. His major league batting average was .210 in 281 at bats.

Manager in Seattle and Milwaukee
Lachemann began managing in the Oakland Athletics' farm system in 1973, and switched to the Seattle organization five years later. On May 6, 1981, Lachemann was promoted from Triple-A Spokane to succeed Maury Wills as the M's manager.

Lachemann was a major league coach for the next eight seasons, under John McNamara with the Boston Red Sox (1985–86) and La Russa with the Oakland Athletics (1987–92). He was the third-base coach with Boston's 1986 American League champions and the Athletics during their three consecutive (1988–90) American League pennants, and their 1989 World Series championship.

First Marlins' manager
Due to his success with the Athletics, on October 23, 1992, he became the expansion Marlins’ first manager when they entered the National League at the outset of the 1993 season. He was chosen over candidates such as former major league managers Bill Virdon and Jimy Williams, and also was a finalist for the managerial job with the Texas Rangers, who hired Kevin Kennedy.

In the strike-shortened season of 1994, they went  for a fifth-place finish. For 1996, the team was playing slightly below average, being  by the time of the All-Star break. On July 7, Lachemann and hitting coach Jose Morales were fired. Lachemann was replaced by John Boles, a front-office executive for the Marlins at the time (Cookie Rojas was the interim manager for one game). General manager Dave Dombrowski described the move as an "extremely difficult decision to make at this time," citing the team's play as the reason for the change. Lachemann described his biggest regret that he would not be around to see the team win. As the Marlins' manager, Lachemann compiled a  record. The next year, the Marlins won the World Series.

Later coaching career
He returned to the coaching ranks the following season, on La Russa's staff with the St. Louis Cardinals, then coached for the Chicago Cubs and the Mariners, before returning to Oakland in 2005 for three years as bench coach and third base coach. His contract was not renewed after 2007 and he joined the Colorado Rockies' organization in 2008. Lachemann served through 2012 as hitting coach for their Triple-A affiliate Colorado Springs, then was added to the Rockies' MLB staff in 2013 by manager Walt Weiss, a former Oakland shortstop. He worked under Weiss for four seasons, until the Rockies changed managers at the close of 2016.

Including a one-game stint as interim manager of the 2002 Cubs, Lachemann's major league managing record was 428 wins, 560 losses (.433).

Managerial record

See also
 List of St. Louis Cardinals coaches

References

External links

Retrosheet
Venezuelan Professional Baseball League

1945 births
Living people
Arizona Instructional League Athletics players
Baseball coaches from California
Baseball players from Los Angeles
Birmingham Barons players
Boston Red Sox coaches
Burlington Bees players
Caribbean Series managers
Chattanooga Lookouts managers
Chicago Cubs coaches
Chicago Cubs managers
Colorado Rockies (baseball) coaches
Florida Instructional League Athletics players
Florida Marlins managers
Iowa Oaks players
Kansas City Athletics players
Kansas City Royals scouts
Leones del Caracas players
American expatriate baseball players in Venezuela
Major League Baseball bench coaches
Major League Baseball third base coaches
Milwaukee Brewers managers
Minor league baseball coaches
Mobile A's players
Oakland Athletics coaches
Oakland Athletics players
Rochester Red Wings players
Seattle Mariners coaches
Seattle Mariners managers
St. Louis Cardinals coaches
Spokane Indians managers
USC Trojans baseball players
Vancouver Mounties players
Susan Miller Dorsey High School alumni